Sebastian Mila (born 10 July 1982) is a Polish former footballer who played as an attacking midfielder for clubs including; Lechia Gdańsk, Dyskobolia Grodzisk Wielkopolski and Śląsk Wrocław. His longest spell at a club was with Śląsk Wrocław with whom he won the Ekstraklasa and Polish Super Cup. He played for two teams outside of Poland; Austria Wien in Austria, who he won the Austrian Bundesliga with. And had a short spell with Vålerenga in Norway. Mila was an international for the Poland national team getting a total of 38 caps and scoring 8 goals for his national team and was included in the nation's squad for the 2006 FIFA World Cup.

Club career

Early years
Born in Koszalin, Mila grew up playing for local teams Gwardia Koszalin and Bałtyk Koszalin before he moved to Gdańsk at the age of 16 and started training with the Lechia Gdańsk youth teams. Lechia Gdańsk at this time were known as Lechia-Polonia Gdańsk due to the merger between Lechia Gdańsk and Polonia Gdańsk.

Lechia Gdańsk
Mila progressed into the Lechia Gdańsk first team during the 1999–2000 season, making his professional debut against Świt Nowy Dwór Mazowiecki in March 2000. During his first season playing for Lechia he played in 12 games and scoring two goals in the II liga. The following season Mila played 22 times and scoring two goals, being unable to prevent Lechia-Polonia Gdańsk from being relegated into the third division, a relegation which would result in the break up of the merger and the recreation of Lechia Gdańsk and Polonia Gdańsk in the lower divisions. The relegation saw an exodus of players leaving the club, Mila included.

Wisła Płock
Mila moved to II liga team Wisła Płock during the 2001 summer. During the first half of the season Mila and Wisła were performing well, with Mila playing 15 of the 19 games. His performances caught the eye of top division team Dyskobolia Grodzisk Wielkopolski, with Mila making the transfer during the winter transfer window. Wisła Płock finished the season runners up, and were promoted to the top division.

Dyskobolia Grodzisk Wielkopolski
His move to Dyskobolia Grodzisk Wielkopolski saw early success in Mila's career. In his first full season Dyskobolia finished runners up in the Ekstraklasa resulting in European football for the following season. Mila played in every game of the team's European adventure in the UEFA Cup, beating FK Atlantas and Hertha Berlin before a second round tie with Manchester City. After the 0–0 draw at home, it was the away leg which brought Mila to the attention of European and Polish football fans. Mila scored from a free kick against David Seaman resulting in Dyskobolia progressing due to away goals. Dyskobolia faced Bordeaux in the next round, and were knocked out losing 5–1 on aggregate. Dyskobolia ended up finishing the season in 4th. The following season started well for Dyskobolia in a season which would see the team finishing runners up in the Ekstraklasa once more, as well as winning the Polish Cup. Mila played 13 games in the league during the autumn round as well as one game in the successful cup run.

Austria Vienna
During the winter break of the 2004–05 season Mila moved to Austria Vienna. In his first season with Austria he played 13 times in half a season, during which Austria finished in third place and won the Austrian Cup. The following season, his first full season at the club, he didn't manage to play any more games than the previous season. Despite not being able to claim a consistent starting position, Mila helped Austria to win the 2005–06 Austrian Bundesliga as well as his second Austrian Cup. The 2006–07 season was a turning point for Vienna as a club, with the team not having the same funds as before and many players leaving at the start of the season and during the winter transfer window. After playing 10 games at the start of the season Mila was one of those players to leave in January. Austria struggled for the rest of the season, finishing in a disappointing 6th.

Vålerenga & ŁKS Łódź
In January 2007 Mila joined Vålerenga for the 2007 Tippeligaen season. Mila made 14 appearances for Vålerenga over the course of the season, with the team finishing in 7th. In February 2008 Mila moved back to Poland, moving on loan to ŁKS Łódź for the remainder of the 2007–08. Mila played 12 of the remaining 15 fixtures of the season in the Ekstraklasa as he helped the team stay above the relegation zone.

Śląsk Wrocław
Mila joined newly promoted Ekstraklasa team Śląsk Wrocław. He instantly became a key player for Śląsk, and helped the team to win the Ekstraklasa Cup in the 2008–09 season, as well as an impressive 6th place in the league. Śląsk Wrocław finished the following season in 9th, with Mila becoming captain for the start of the following season. As captain he led the team finish runners-up in the 2010–11 season. The 2011–12 season was to be a historic one for Śląsk. After qualifying for the UEFA Europa League, Śląsk managed to reach the qualification playoff before losing the game to Rapid București. In the league Mila played 27 of the 30 games as Śląsk Wrocław won the league, finishing 1 point ahead of second place Ruch Chorzów. The 2012–13 season was Mila's most successful in terms of individual statistics. While leading the team to a Polish Super Cup win, beating Legia Warsaw, and to a third-place finish in the Ekstraklasa, Mila played 40 games and scored 10 goals in all competitions. The following season saw Śląsk struggle, finishing in the relegation group in the league, and finishing in 9th once the season had finished. At the beginning of the 2014–15 season Mila played every single game before the winter break. After the team's fortunes and financial status declining, the decision was made to sell Mila during the winter transfer window. Over his  seasons at Śląsk Wrocław he won three competitions and made 216 and scored 39 goals in all competitions during this time.

Return to Lechia Gdańsk
During much of his time at Śląsk Wrocław, Mila often wore a Lechia Gdańsk sweat band on his right wrist during games. He often expressed his love for the team he started supporting after his early years at the club, and stated that he wanted to play for the club again. This opportunity was given to Mila in January 2015 when he made his return to Lechia after 13 years. Mila instantly became the Lechia captain, and played 16 games in his first half season back with the team. In his first full season he made 29 appearances with 2 goals, with what became his last professional goal coming against Ruch Chorzów. The following season, 2016–17, he made 8 appearances, and in 2017–18, one appearance. His final professional appearance came for Lechia Gdańsk against Górnik Zabrze on 5 August 2017, in which he came on as a substitute playing for the final 2 minutes. After his retirement he started working as a football pundit on TVP Sport.

International career
A European U18 Championship winner with Poland in 2001, Mila has 38 caps for the full Poland national football team. He was selected to the 23-men national team for the 2006 FIFA World Cup finals in Germany, but did not make an appearance in any of the games. He also participated at the 1999 FIFA U-17 World Championship in New Zealand. On 11 October 2014, he scored his first international goal for over six years, finishing off a 2–0 European qualifying win which was Poland's first ever victory against Germany, as well as the first win over reigning World Champions in 29 years.

Honours
Dyskobolia Grodzisk Wielkopolski
Ekstraklasa
Runners-up: 2002–03, 2004–05
Polish Cup
Winners: 2004–05

Austria Vienna
Austrian Bundesliga
Winners: 2005–06
Third place: 2004–05
Austrian Cup
Winners: 2004–05, 2005–06

Śląsk Wrocław
Ekstraklasa
Winners: 2011–12
Runners-up: 2010–11
Third place: 2012–13
Polish SuperCup
Winners: 2012
Ekstraklasa Cup
Winners: 2008–09

Career statistics

Club

1 All appearances in Ekstraklasa Cup.
2 All appearances in Polish Super Cup.

International goals
Scores and results list Poland's goal tally first.

References

External links
 
 
 

1982 births
Living people
People from Koszalin
Sportspeople from West Pomeranian Voivodeship
Polish footballers
Poland international footballers
Polish expatriate footballers
Lechia Gdańsk players
Wisła Płock players
Dyskobolia Grodzisk Wielkopolski players
ŁKS Łódź players
FK Austria Wien players
Vålerenga Fotball players
Śląsk Wrocław players
Association football midfielders
2006 FIFA World Cup players
Austrian Football Bundesliga players
Expatriate footballers in Austria
Expatriate footballers in Norway
Ekstraklasa players
Eliteserien players
Polish expatriate sportspeople in Austria
Polish expatriate sportspeople in Norway